Country Dance Favorites is a studio album by country music singer Faron Young. It was released in 1964 by Mercury Records (catalog SR-60931).

The album debuted on Billboard magazine's country album chart on October 3, 1964, peaked at No. 7, and remained on the chart for a total of 19 weeks.

AllMusic gave the album a rating of three stars.

Track listing
Side A
 "Save the Last Dance for Me"
 "You Don't Know Me"
 "Honky Tonk Song"
 "Release Me (And Let Me Love Again)"
 "Dance Her By Me (One More Time)"
 "Am I That Easy to Forget"

Side B
 "She Thinks I Still Care"
 "Faded Love"
 "Till I Waltz Again with You"
 "I Can't Stop Loving You"
 "San Antonio Rose"
 "The Last Waltz"

References

1964 albums
Faron Young albums
Mercury Records albums